Fotbal Club Municipal Târgoviște, commonly known as FCM Târgoviște, was a Romanian football team based in Târgoviște, Dâmbovița County, founded in 1948 and disbanded in 2018.

FCM Târgoviște, which throughout history bore several other names, amassed nine appearances in the Divizia A, the highest tier of the Romanian league system, and their best result in the competition was finishing seventh in the 1978–79 campaign.

The fate of the team became troubled in the 2010s; firstly, Târgoviște was dissolved in 2015 but refounded and enrolled in the sixth division the next year, and then in 2018 owner Ghiorghi Zotic announced that he would give up on the men's football team and focus only on the women squad instead.

History
The first team of the town, FCM Târgoviște, was founded after the end of World War II in 1948 as Metalul Târgoviște. Subsequently named Energia (1956), then again Metalul (1957–1972), CS (1972–1994), Oțelul (1994–1996) and Chindia (1996–2003), the club spent only nine seasons of its existence in the top flight. It promoted for the first time in 1961, but was immediately relegated. Then "the Red and Blues" promoted again in 1977 and played constantly at the level of the first division for the next seven campaigns, with only a short break in the 1980–81 Divizia B. At the end of the 1970s and the beginning of the 1980s the football of Targoviște reached its peak, which besides launching a very good generation of players, achieved the best ranking in the history of the club, a seventh place at the end of the 1978–79 championship.

That squad of "the club situated under the Chindia Tower" would be called "the golden generation" and in its composition were the following players: Nicolae Dobrin, Silviu Dumitrescu, Ion Ene, Florea Alexandru, Ionel Pitaru, Dumitru Gheorghe, Claudius Sava, Nelu Isaia, Gheorghe Greaca, Nicolae Enache, Petre Marinescu, Ion Constantin, Ilie Niculescu, Viorel Radu, Constantin Miia, Gheorghe Voinea, Mihai Iatan, Mihai Banu, Mihai Mărgelatu, Gheorghe Filipescu and Dumitru Economu.

After relegating in 1984, CS Târgoviște did not recover, at one point even playing in the Divizia C. The year 1995 brought the promotion in the second division, followed by another one in 1996; Under the name CF Chindia and led from the bench by its former player Silviu Dumitrescu, the squad was one of the most notable that ever played on Eugen Popescu Stadium. Even if it probably was not as good as Dumitrescu's generation, the promotion achieved in 1996, after twelve years in the lower divisions, the playing style and the squad, which consisted in local players, earned Chindia the nickname Micul Ajax ("the Little Ajax"). In that squad of Chindia were players such as: Adrian Bogoi, Vasile Bârdeș, Bogdan Liță, Cristian Țermure, Cristian Bălașa, Remus Gâlmencea or Laurențiu Reghecampf. The period of glory was again a very short one and at the end of 1997–98 season Chindia returned to the second division.

In 2003 the team changed its name to FCM Târgoviște, and in the summer of 2004, due to financial issues it almost withdrew from the championship. On 19 August 2004, businessman Ghiorghi Zotic took over the club with the clear goal of saving it from both relegation and bankruptcy. In 2009, the team relegated back to Liga III and the relationship between Zotic and the Târgoviște Municipality started to strain, just like the one between him and the supporters. In March 2010, the Eugen Popescu Stadium rental agreement expired and was not extended. Since then the club moved away from Târgoviște to the Alpan Stadium in Șotânga. From this point on, FCM started its total decline and in 2015 Zotic dissolved the club's senior squad, only keeping the women's football team. After one year, FCM enrolled in the sixth tier, but after two seasons was dissolved again.

Chronology of names

Honours
Liga II
Winners (4): 1960–61, 1976–77, 1980–81, 1995–96
Runners-up (3): 1962–63, 1963–64, 1969–70
Liga III
Winners (2): 1968–69, 1994–95
Runners-up (5): 1956, 1957–58, 1976–77, 2002–03, 2009–10

Other performances 
 Appearances in Liga I: 9
 Best finish in Liga I: 7th (1978–79)

References

External links
 Official website
 FCM Târgoviște at frf-ajf.ro

 
Football clubs in Dâmbovița County
Sport in Târgoviște
Association football clubs established in 1948
Association football clubs disestablished in 2018
Liga I clubs
Liga II clubs
Liga III clubs
1948 establishments in Romania
2018 disestablishments in Romania